Ellen Stekert (b. 1935) is an American academic, folklorist and musician. Stekert is a Professor Emerita of English at the University of Minnesota.

Early life and education 
Stekert was born in New York City in 1935 and grew up in Great Neck on Long Island. She survived polio as a child. Stekert began performing folk music in high school and has recorded several albums.

Stekert attended Cornell University, where she took classes taught by the folklorist Harold Thompson, who she also assisted in teaching.  As her interest in folklore grew, Stekert began doing fieldwork, collecting folksongs from traditional singers in upstate New York. The songs Stekert collected from Ezra "Fuzzy" Barhight, a retired lumberjack from Cohocton, New York, she recorded and released as Songs of a New York Lumberjack in 1958.

After graduating in philosophy at Cornell, Stekert began a Masters degree in folklore at Indiana University. There she continued her fieldwork, collecting folk songs in Kentucky and Southern Indiana. On completion of her M.A., Stekert began research for a Ph.D. in folklore at Indiana.  She completed her doctorate at the University of Pennsylvania, Philadelphia due to the attitude towards her work of her supervisor at Indiana, Richard Dorson.  Stekert completed her Ph.D. in 1965.

Career 
Stekert's first teaching position was at Wayne State University in Detroit. There, Stekert built upon the pioneering work of Thelma G. James in the collection of urban folklore traditions. 

From there, she moved to the University of Minnesota where she was based for the rest of her academic career.

Recognition 
Stekert served as president of the American Folklore Society for the year 1977. She was also appointed Minnesota's state folklorist.

Selected publications 
Stekert, Ellen (1963). "The Hidden Informant". Midwest Folklore. 13 (1): 21–28. .

Stekert, Ellen (1959). "Fairy Palace". Western Folklore. 18 (1): 50–50.  

Stekert, Ellen J. (1970). "Foreword: The Urban Experience and Folk Tradition". The Journal of American Folklore. 83 (328): iii–iv. 

Stekert, Ellen J. (1970-04). "Focus for Conflict: Southern Mountain Medical Beliefs in Detroit". The Journal of American Folklore. 83 (328): 115. 

Paredes, Américo and Stekert, Ellen Jane (eds.) (1971) The urban experience and folk tradition. . Austin: Published for the American Folklore Society by the University of Texas Press. 1971.  

Dorson, R. M., Baker, R. L., Byington, R. H., Carey, G., Georges, R. A., Green, T. A., Stekert, E. J., & Teske, R. T. (1972). The Academic Future of Folklore. The Journal of American Folklore, 85, 104–125. 

Stekert, Ellen J. (1987). "Autobiography of a Woman Folklorist". The Journal of American Folklore. 100 (398): 579–585. . 

Stekert, Ellen J. (1993). 'Cents and Nonsense in the Urban Folksong Movement: 1930–1966'. In Transforming Tradition, ed. Neil V.Rosenberg. Urbana: University of Illinois Press, pp. 84–106.

Selected discography 
Stekert, Ellen (1950s) Ozark Mountain folksongs. Vol. 1 Vol. 1, New York, N.Y.: Stinson Records, SLP #49, retrieved 2022-05-30

Stekert, Ellen (c.1957) Ballads of careless love: love songs from Great Britain and the United States, Ithaca, NY: Cornell Recording Society, CRS-10050, retrieved 2022-05-30

Okun, Milt; Stekert, Ellen (1957) Traditional American love songs, New York: Riverside, RLP 12-634, retrieved 2022-05-30

Stekert, Ellen (1958) Songs of a New York lumberjack, Folkways Records - FA 2354, retrieved 2022-05-30

Pete Seeger, Jerry Silverman, The New Lost City Rambler, The Harvesters, Elizabeth Knight, Hermes Nye, Ellen Stekert, Sandy Ives, Bill Macadoo, Bascom Lamar Lunsford. (1963) Songs of the Civil War

References

External links
Ellen Stekert performing in Minneapolis, 2017
Folklorist Ellen Stekert Performs and Shares Stories from Folklore, AMPERS

Living people
University of Minnesota faculty
1935 births
People from Great Neck, New York
People from Minneapolis
Cornell University alumni
American folklorists
American folk-song collectors
American folk musicians
Presidents of the American Folklore Society